"I'm a Man" is a protest song by American singer and songwriter Michelle Branch. The single was released on July 14, 2022, through Nonesuch Records. It serves as the lead single from her fourth studio album The Trouble with Fever, released on September 16, 2022. The song tackles women's rights, toxic masculinity, reproductive rights, sexual harassment, and more. It was written by Branch and Patrick Carney of the Black Keys.

Background
In August 2018 Branch gave birth to her first son with Patrick Carney. When writing "I'm a Man", Branch says, "having a son made me think of how men are taught to be from a young age and the pressures to provide and succeed and this sort of burden to be seen as macho."

The song started as an empathetic view towards men struggling to find a new way to navigate in a post-‘Me Too’ world of toxic masculinity but it later started telling the story of the struggles that women have also been dealing with, "really, since Eve bit the apple."

Branch asks rhetorically, "why are nearly all mass shooters male? Why do I need my husband’s written permission in 2022 to get my tubes tied? Why do American women have fewer reproductive rights than our grandmothers? Why don’t we get paid as much as men? Why do I have to teach my daughters not to walk alone at night? And so on and so on."

Music video
Following the release of "I'm a Man", the official music video was released shortly after. The accompanying music video features incorporating footage from "Silent Parade 1917, Dyke March, and Roe v. Wade protest at the Supreme Court. The video also shows other footage from the ‘50s through today, highlighting the ways in which women have fought for their rights.

References

2022 singles
2022 songs
Michelle Branch songs